Anime in hip hop is a recent phenomenon in which anime and hip hop, two distinct subcultures, have collided to form a new sub-genre in today's globalized popular culture. From the globalization of these two cultures they have had an impact on each other. Many rappers have been influenced by anime from the clothing that they wear to the lyrics that they say in their songs. Hip hop has also had a hand in anime for a very long time to the point where characters in animes have been clearly influenced by hip hop culture and will rap. The two subcultures have influenced each other since the 1990s

Anime's influence on Hip Hop 
Many notable rappers and artists such as RZA (of the Wu-Tang Clan), Kanye West, Robb Bank$, and Frank Ocean have taken inspiration from anime when creating their music.

From as early as 1990 and onwards, Akira (1988) was crowned as being among the earliest in anime to impact hip hop culture. One notable music video that features clips from Akira is the 1995 song titled "Scream" performed by Michael Jackson and Janet Jackson. Kanye West has also cited Akira as a major influence on his work, West paid homage to the film in the "Stronger" (2007) music video. Lupe Fiasco's album Tetsuo & Youth (2015) is named after Tetsuo Shima.

The Dragon Ball franchise, particularly Dragon Ball Z (19891996), had an impact on hip hop culture from the 1990s onwards.  It has been referenced in numerous hip hop songs by rappers and artists such as Chris Brown, Chance the Rapper, Big Sean, Lil Uzi Vert, The Weeknd, Childish Gambino, Thundercat, B.o.B, Soulja Boy, Drake, Frank Ocean, XXXTentacion, Juice Wrld, Trippie Redd, OhSo Kew and Sese. Mark Sammut of TheGamer notes that Gohan occasionally performs the dab move (as The Great Saiyaman), decades before it became a popular hip-hop dance move in American popular culture.

In mid-2015 Canadian rapper Sese, aka Lord Frieza, released his mixtape The Frieza Saga, which was entirely inspired by Dragon Ball Z. "One of my friends was talking about how epic the battles on Dragon Ball Z were and then we started talking about how crazy the parallels between hip-hop and the show are," Sese explains. Lil Uzi Vert owns several cars decorated with anime characters (also known as Itasha), including one with characters from K-On! and Sword Art Online. With his 2021 album Trip At Knight, Trippie Redd released the song Super Cell which incorporates multiple references to Dragon Ball in its lyrics.

Another well known hip hop artist who has been influenced by anime is the rapper Megan Thee Stallion. She has anime all across her social media platforms. She has been seen doing cosplay, such as when she went to Japan’s Summer Sonic Festival where she wore Sailor Moon (1992-1997) inspired costume. Having anime inspired nails, which can be seen all over her instagram. Even referencing popular animes in her songs, such as in her song Girls in the Hood (July, 2020) she says “ p**** like a wild fox, looking for a Sasuke,” which is a reference to the Naruto (2002-2017) franchise. During a shoot for Paper Magazine she dressed up as a character from the hit anime My Hero Academia (2016). During many of her interviews she mentions some type of anime reference and during an interview with Crunchyroll, which is a popular anime streaming site, she talks about how anime has been apart of her life since childhood. She also has her own merch line with Crunchyroll celebrating Naruto and the Hidden Leaf.

Hip Hop's influence on anime 
Since the early 1960s, anime has become increasingly more profitable in Western countries. The growth of the Internet has provided Western audiences an easy way to access Japanese content. This has seemingly influenced many anime creators to incorporate more Western culture in their productions. The Western market has influenced the creation of many popular hip-hop inspired anime titles such as Afro Samurai, Samurai Champloo, Tokyo Tribes, PaRappa the Rapper, and Detroit Metal City.

Afro Samurai, is an excellent example of hip hop influence on anime the accompanying musical stylings of RZA (of the Wu-Tang Clan), allow the viewer to dive deep into understanding the powerful concepts behind the anime such as the ideas of racial identity, liberation, and honor.

Additionally, Samurai Champloo, is one of the most strongly influenced hip-hop anime's. The anime features the late Japanese hip hop producer Nujabes. From the creators of Cowboy Bebop, The anime uses hip hop and rap musical influences rather than the jazz influences of its prior counterpart to help convey its story and during many of the action and fighting scenes. 
 
Other anime that has been influenced by hip hop include Naruto (particularly the character Killer B), Megalo Box, Michiko & Hatchin, Tokyo Tribe 2 and Devilman Crybaby. The anime series Gurren Lagann also draws influence from hip hop, including "what might be the greatest hip-hop song in the genre" according to Michael Iacono of Comic Book Resources (CBR). The Boondocks is an anime-influenced animation that combines elements of both anime and hip hop.

Furthermore, Gorillaz is an animated musical group influenced heavily by hip-hop, rap, funk, pop, and rhythm and blues. The group features different musical artists to help accompany the virtual band on their songs many being hip-hop and rap recording artists like De La Soul, featured on the group's Grammy Award-winning song, Feel Good Inc. The animated act helped shaped the hip-hop genre and infused animation with elements of music, art, storytelling, and cinematography.

See also
 Anime-influenced animation
 Japanese hip hop
 Alternative Hip Hop

References

Anime
Hip hop